Kimberly Halkett is a Canadian journalist who has covered the White House and American news since 1998, first for Global Television, then for Al Jazeera when it launched its English channel.

Early life
Halkett was born in Victoria, British Columbia. She graduated from Ryerson Polytechnical Institute (now Ryerson University) in 1992.

Career
Halkett previously worked as White House correspondent for Canada's Global Television Network. In 1998, she started to work for Al Jazeera English. Since then she has covered the White House for this organization. She has reported on the Clinton, Bush, Obama, and Trump administrations. She is currently covering the administration of Joe Biden.

Topics she covers include U.S. politics, human rights, Middle East, religion, justice, intelligence, and security.

References

External links
 
 Profile on Al Jazeera

Canadian television journalists
Living people
Al Jazeera people
Toronto Metropolitan University alumni
Year of birth missing (living people)
Canadian women journalists
Journalists from British Columbia
Global Television Network people
People from Victoria, British Columbia